Chris Arnade (born ) is an American photographer. He worked for twenty years as a bond trader on Wall Street; in 2011, he started documenting the lives of poor people and their drug addictions, and commenting on the state of the society of the United States. He did this through photographs posted on social media and articles in various media, most often The Guardian. He does not call himself a "journalist", though some journalists object to his methods and other sources refer to him as a journalist.

Early life
Arnade was born around 1965 and was brought up in San Antonio, Florida, a conservative, Roman Catholic community. His father was of Jewish heritage, had escaped Nazi Germany and had become a professor in the US. His mother was a homemaker who raised a family of seven children (Chris has five brothers and one sister) and then became an academic librarian. He went to college and then to Johns Hopkins University, where he earned a PhD in particle physics.

Career
Arnade started working on Wall Street in 1993 as a quantitative analyst. A former colleague told The Wall Street Journal that he frequently argued politics with other traders, most of whom were in the "libertarian wing of the Republican Party"; Arnade eventually tired of "hearing [traders] who had lost millions and gotten bailed out complaining that Obamacare raised their taxes." Arnade called his work on Wall Street "intellectual grift".

Arnade worked on Wall Street for 20 years, with the last position being on the foreign trading desk at Citigroup. As the financial crisis of 2007–2008 unfolded, Arnade became more disillusioned with his industry, and began riding the subway to its last stop and then walking home, which often led him through the Bronx, where he talked to people and began taking their pictures. He also did volunteer work in the Bronx, with the Hunts Point Alliance for Children, which led him into engagement with people who lived there. In 2012 his mother died, and that same year Citi shut down the trading desk he was working on due to new regulations. He accepted a buyout from Citi in 2012 and retired. Then, he began to spend all his time exploring the lives of poor and working-class people. To deal with the reduced income, his family moved from Brooklyn to upstate New York.

By 2013, he had published a series of photographs of sex workers and addicts in the Bronx on Flickr called Faces of Addiction. That work was criticized by photojournalists, who have a system of ethics that forbids paying people. It also received criticism by advocates for poor people, as well as by Michael Kamber, a former journalist for The New York Times and the director of the Bronx Documentary Center, who said that Arnade manipulated his subjects, and that Arnade's pictures reinforced stereotypes and humiliated their subjects. Arnade in turn criticized what photojournalists do, and asked “What right do you have to make someone’s suffering pretty?”

In 2014, Arnade started to take trips driving across the country, visiting small towns, many in the Rust Belt, as well as cities, and would photograph people and talk with them in the street or in the places where they spent time, like fast food restaurants. He also started getting his stories and pictures published in The Guardian and The Atlantic, which brought in some income.  He mostly published on social media, like Twitter and Flickr.

He came to a perspective that there is a division by social class in the United States between what he calls the "front row kids" and the "back row kids", with knowledge workers, including many people in American media, in the "front row", and most of the poor and working-class people in the "back row"; he explained the victory of Donald Trump as being due to Trump's articulation of the unmet needs, and unheard voice and hopelessness, of the "back row kids" and Democrats' failures to hear or address the needs of most Americans due to the Democratic leadership being "front row kids" themselves. When Trump accepted the nomination as the Republican candidate for the 2016 United States presidential election, Arnade was in Ohio, but not at the convention; he was in a strip club in Parma, a working-class suburb of Cleveland, watching people celebrate.

Arnade identifies politically as a socialist.

References

External links
 Arnade's Twitter feed
 
 BBC video interview, November 26, 2016

Living people
Florida socialists
Johns Hopkins University alumni
1960s births
American online journalists
American people of German-Jewish descent
Social documentary photographers
People from San Antonio, Florida